The Human Goddess Chinese: 仙女下凡, Sin Lui Ha Fan is a 1972 Hong Kong fantasy film comedy directed by Ho Heng Hua.

Plot 
Seventh sister comes down from heaven to Hong Kong to see the mortal world.

Cast
Lee Ching
Chin Feng
Paang Paang
Dean Shek
 Christine Pai
Baak Liu
Chiu Hung
Lee Pang Fei
Suen Lam
Hoh Ban
Wu Wei

References

External links
 IMDb entry
 Hong Kong Cinemagic entry

1972 films
1970s fantasy comedy films
1970s Mandarin-language films
Hong Kong fantasy comedy films
1972 comedy films
Films directed by Ho Meng Hua
1970s Hong Kong films